Riverwood railway station is located on the East Hills line, serving the Sydney suburb of Riverwood. It is served by Sydney Trains T8 Airport & South line services.

History
Riverwood station opened on 21 December 1931 as Herne Bay when the line was extended from Kingsgrove to East Hills. The line was duplicated from Kingsgrove in 1948. It was renamed Riverwood on 10 March 1958.

On 5 May 1986, the line was duplicated from Riverwood to Padstow with a new track laid to the north of the existing one.

In 2002 the station was upgraded and given lifts. 

In 2013, as part of the quadruplication of the line from Kingsgrove to Revesby, through lines were added on either side of the existing pair.

Platforms & services

Transport links
Punchbowl Bus Company operates four routes via Riverwood station:
940: Hurstville station to Bankstown station
942: Lugarno to Campsie station
944: Mortdale station to Bankstown station
945: Hurstville station to Bankstown station

Riverwood station is served by one NightRide route:
N20: to Town Hall station

References

External links

Riverwood Station details Transport for New South Wales

Easy Access railway stations in Sydney
Railway stations in Sydney
Railway stations in Australia opened in 1931
East Hills railway line
City of Canterbury-Bankstown
Georges River Council